FishBase is a global species database of fish species (specifically finfish). It is the largest and most extensively accessed online database on adult finfish on the web. Over time it has "evolved into a dynamic and versatile ecological tool" that is widely cited in scholarly publications.

FishBase provides comprehensive species data, including information on taxonomy, geographical distribution, biometrics and morphology, behaviour and habitats, ecology and population dynamics as well as reproductive, metabolic and genetic data. There is access to tools such as trophic pyramids, identification keys, biogeographical modelling and fishery statistics and there are direct species level links to information in other databases such as LarvalBase, GenBank, the IUCN Red List and the Catalog of Fishes.

, FishBase included descriptions of 35,100 species and subspecies, with 325,900 common names, 62,200 pictures, and references to 59,800 works in the scientific literature. The site has about 700,000 visits per month.

History
The origins of FishBase go back to the 1970s, when the fisheries scientist Daniel Pauly found himself struggling to test a hypothesis on how the growing ability of fish was affected by the size of their gills. Hypotheses, such as this one, could be tested only if large amounts of empirical data were available. At the time, fisheries management used analytical models which required estimates for fish growth and mortality. It can be difficult for fishery scientists and managers to get the information they need on the species that concern them, because the relevant facts can be scattered across and buried in numerous journal articles, reports, newsletters and other sources. It can be particularly difficult for people in developing countries who need such information. Pauly believed that the only practical way fisheries managers could access the volume of data they needed was to assemble and consolidate all the data available in the published literature into some central and easily accessed repository. Such a database would be particularly useful if the data has also been standardised and validated. This would mean that when scientists or managers need to test a new hypothesis, the available data will already be there in a validated and accessible form, and there will be no need to create a new dataset and then have to validate it.

Pauly recruited Rainer Froese, and the beginnings of a software database along these lines was encoded in 1988. This database, initially confined to tropical fish, became the prototype for FishBase. FishBase was subsequently extended to cover all finfish, and was launched on the Web in August 1996. It is now the largest and most accessed online database for fish in the world. In 1995 the first CD-ROM was released as "FishBase 100". Subsequent CDs have been released annually. The software runs on Microsoft Access which operates only on Microsoft Windows.

FishBase covers adult finfish, but does not detail the early and juvenile stages of fish. In 1999 a complementary database, called LarvalBase, went online under the supervision of Bernd Ueberschär. It covers ichthyoplankton and the juvenile stage of fishes, with detailed data on fish eggs and larvae, fish identification, as well as data relevant to the rearing of young fish in aquaculture. Given FishBase's success, there was a demand for a database covering forms of aquatic life other than finfish. This resulted, in 2006, in the birth of SeaLifeBase. The long-term goal of SeaLifeBase is to develop an information system modelled on FishBase, but including all forms of aquatic life, both marine and freshwater, apart from the finfish which FishBase specialises in. Altogether, there are about 300,000 known species in this category.

Current organization
As awareness of FishBase has grown among fish specialists, it has attracted over 2,480 contributors and collaborators. Since 2000 FishBase has been supervised by a consortium of nine international institutions. To date, the FishBase consortium has grown to twelve members. The GEOMAR – Helmholtz Centre for Ocean Research for Ocean Research Kiel (GEOMAR) in Germany, functions as the coordinating body.

See also
Catalog of Fishes
List of online encyclopedias

References

Further reading
 Bailly N (2010) Why there may be discrepancies in the assessment of scientific names between the Catalog of Fishes and FishBase Version 2, 6 May 2010.
 Bailly N, Reyes Jr R, Atanacio R and Froese R (2010) "Simple Identification Tools in FishBase" In: Nimis PL and Vignes Lebbe R. (eds) Tools for Identifying Biodiversity: Progress and Problems, pages 31–36. .
 Christensen V, CJ Walters, R Ahrens, J Alder, J Buszowski, LB Christensen, WWL Cheung, J Dunne, R Froese, V Karpouzi, K Kaschner, K Kearney, S Lai, V Lam, MLD Palomares, A Peters-Mason, C Piroddia, JL Sarmiento, J Steenbeek, R Sumaila, R Watson, D Zeller and D Pauly (2009) Database-driven models of the world's Large Marine Ecosystems Ecological Modelling, 220(17): 1984–1996.
 Froese R (2011) "The science in Fishbase" In: Villy Christensen and Jay Maclean (eds) Ecosystem Approaches to Fisheries: A Global Perspective, Cambridge University Press, pages 47–54. .
 Froese R and Pauly D (eds) (2000) FishBase 2000: concepts, design and data sources ICLARM, Philippines.
 Froese R and Pauly D (1994) "Fishbase as a tool for comparing the life history patterns of flatfish" Netherlands Journal of Sea Research, 32(3/4): 235–239.
 Nauen CE (2004) A public electronic archive on the world’s fishes in support of sustainable fisheries  CTA/Commonwealth Secretariat Seminar, Expert Meeting on ACP-EU Fisheries Relations, Brussels.
 Palomares, M.L.D., N. Bailly and D. Pauly (2009) FishBase, SeaLifeBase and database-driven ecosystem modeling p. 156-158. In: M.L.D. Palomares, L. Morissette, A. Cisnero-Montemayor, D. Varkey, M. Coll and C. Piroddi (eds.) Ecopath 25 Years Conference Proceedings: Extended Abstracts. UBC Fisheries Centre Research Reports 17(3).
 Pauly D (1997) "The Science in FishBase" EC Fisheries Cooperation Bulletin, 10(2): 4–6.
 Robertson R (2008) "Global biogeographical data bases on marine fishes: caveat emptor" Diversity and Distributions, 14(6): 891–892.
 Ueberschär B and Teltow M (1999) "FishBase goes fishing" Bulletin, 12(2–3): 38–39.

External links

 FishBase online
 The Fish Database of Taiwan
 FishBase for Africa
 FishBase FishBlog (FishBase Sverige informerar)
 FishBase Celebrates 20 Year Anniversary in Kiel Science newsline, 3 September 2010.
 Rainer Froese on FishBase Blue Zoo.
 SpeciesBank: Dreams and realities Rainer Froese, Workshop presentation, 2005.
 Fish Morphology and Identification in FishBase Royal Museum for Central Africa (RMCA Tervuren), Presentation at FishBase and Fish Taxonomy Training Session 2007.
 The 6th FishBase Consortium meeting and 3rd Mini FishBase Symposium FishBytes, 2005.
 2008 FishBase Symposium Chinese Academy of Fishery Sciences, 2 September 2008.
 Fish on line Daniel Pauly, Rainer Froese and Maria Lourdes Palomares. A draft guide to learning and teaching ichthyology using the FishBase information system. Updated 17 January 2005.

Ichthyology
Online databases
Biological databases
Fisheries databases
Biology websites
Multilingual websites